Dəmirçidam is a village in the Kalbajar District of Azerbaijan. The village came under the occupation of the self-proclaimed Republic of Artsakh during the First Nagorno-Karabakh War. It was returned to Azerbaijan on 25 November 2020 per the 2020 Nagorno-Karabakh ceasefire agreement.

References 

Populated places in Kalbajar District